The EMD MRS-1 is a type of diesel-electric locomotive built by General Motors Electro-Motive Division for the United States Army Transportation Corps (USATC) in 1952. They were built with multigauge trucks and to a narrow loading gauge for service anywhere in the world in the event of war.  Thirteen of the locomotives were built, with serial numbers 15873–15885.  At almost $500,000 each in 1952 dollars, 
more than three times the price of a standard locomotive of the period, 
these were very expensive locomotives.

Declared un-needed for wartime operations in about 1970, they were then used on various military bases around the United States, with some serving on the Alaska Railroad.  Five locomotives are preserved, three currently in operating condition.

History

Development 

The Korean War and the intensification of the Cold War at the beginning of the 1950s caused the USATC to consider what it might need for a new land war in Europe.
They came up with a requirement for a locomotive capable of running on the existing tracks of a wide variety of railway systems.

The specification was put out to tender, and two companies responded; GM and GE.  Both companies were given contracts to produce a batch of thirteen locomotives which would be evaluated by the USATC; the vendor providing the better locomotive would then produce the rest of the required locomotives.

Both manufacturers delivered their sample batch in 1952, and after testing the GE locomotives, which were actually produced by Alco as a subcontractor, were declared the winner, and a further batch of 70 Alco MRS-1 locomotives were ordered.  No more EMD locomotives were built.

As delivered, they were painted in gloss black with white numbering and lettering.  They were numbered as 1808–1820 in US Army service.

Military service 

The initial fate of most of the MRS-1 locomotives was to be placed in storage at the USATC's Transportation Materiel Command facility at Marietta, Pennsylvania 
awaiting a war to use them in; they had not been purchased for peacetime use. These brand-new locomotives, with at most a couple of weeks' actual use, sat preserved until approximately 1970, when the Pentagon concluded that their plans for a future, large-scale land war no longer included the capture and use of the enemy's railway system.
 
Thus the 96 locomotives were redundant for their original purpose.  Many of the units were taken out of storage and assigned to various military installations around the country, where locomotives of that size and power were required.  Five EMD MRS-1s were sent to the Naval Ammunition Depot in Hawthorne, Nevada (now the Hawthorne Army Depot), but were unsuccessful there and placed into storage.

Cold-weather testing 

Unit #1820 was not placed into storage; instead, it was used initially for cold-weather testing. It was broken in on the Belt Railway of Chicago, and in November 1952 the locomotive was shipped to the Canadian National Railway for testing on the Hudson Bay Railway between The Pas and Churchill, Manitoba, where it became the first diesel locomotive to operate on that line. In May 1953, the locomotive returned to the BRC's shops in Chicago where it was stripped down and examined for abnormal wear from the cold weather, which was not found. The locomotive was then used at Fort Eustis for regular service and training.

Unit #1809 was also sent for cold-weather testing, in this case to the Alaska Railroad for a 3-year trial period. Shipped back in 1955, its engine was rebored to a larger size and slightly greater power output, then placed into storage. In 1969 it was reactivated and sent to the Vandenberg Air Force Base for service hauling supplies for the proposed Manned Orbiting Laboratory and components for Titan launch vehicles.

European testing 

Locomotive #1818 was fitted with European buffers and couplers very soon after delivery and sent to Europe for Army testing and training and secondarily as an EMD demonstrator.  It ran extensively on the Deutsche Bundesbahn (DB) and proved quite successful, although the DB preferred German-designed diesel-hydraulic locomotives.  Subsequently, it tested on both SNCF (France) and NMBS/SNCB (Belgium), in the latter case successfully for GM-EMD since the NMBS/SNCB subsequently purchased EMD-licensed NOHAB locomotives.

Alaska Railroad 

The 1952-1955 trial of #1809 was not the last appearance of an MRS-1 on Alaska Railroad metals.  In 1977, the five MRS-1 locomotives that had been unsuccessfully transferred to the Navy were moved to Alaska to join thirteen of their Alco cousins.

Preserved survivors 
Five of the thirteen EMD MRS-1 locomotives built survive in preservation.
Of these, two (#1809
and #1820) 
are on display at the Pacific Southwest Railway Museum Association; #1811 is on display at the U.S. Army Transportation Museum at Fort Eustis, Virginia; #1813 is retired and on display at the Heber Valley Historic Railroad; and #1818 is preserved at the Museum of Alaska Transportation and Industry in Wasilla, Alaska. #1718 is now on display in Wasilla, Alaska.

Spotting features 

Being produced to the same specification, both GE/ALCO and EMD MRS-1s are very similar in appearance and can easily be mistaken; they are both C-C road-switchers that are very low in profile in order to fit within European loading gauges and structure gauges.  The major exterior differences are the peaked cab roof and long hood roof on the EMD locomotives, and the radiator intakes on the sides of the long hood end, which have outside shutters on the Alco locomotives. In addition, the short hood is visibly lower than the long hood, thanks to the long hood's peaked roof; on the ALCO units, the two are the same height.  The frame side sills are also different; the Alco's are straight from front to rear, while the EMD's step down towards each end of the locomotive.

Naming 

For a long while it was believed that "MRS-1" was an invented railfan name, since it did not appear to have been the official model name in documentation from the USATC or the manufacturers; it was thought to have been derived from "Military Railway Service", the USATC unit that operated them.  However, Stefan Nicolaï has found that the designation "MRS-1" appears on the cover of EMD's operating manual for these locomotives, where it appears as "Military Road Switcher MRS-1".

References

External links

 Tour of an MRS-1 in detail photographs, from the San Diego Railroad Museum.

MRS-1
C-C locomotives
United States Army locomotives
Diesel-electric locomotives of the United States
Standard gauge railway locomotives
5 ft 6 in gauge locomotives